Cycadophyllum is an extinct genus of cycads. It is found only at Thuringer Senke (Triassic of Germany).

References

External links 

 

Prehistoric gymnosperm genera
Cycads
Fossils of Germany